A Cry for Help is a 1975 American made-for-television drama film directed by Daryl Duke and written by Peter S. Fischer. The film starred Robert Culp as an abusive radio talk-show host and premiered as the ABC Movie of the Week on February 12, 1975.

Plot
Harry Freeman is a radio talk-show host who abuses those who call in, but changes his behavior when he receives a call from a suicidal teenage girl. He asks his listeners for help in finding her by soliciting information about her description and possible location.

Cast
Robert Culp as Harry Freeman
Elayne Heilveil as Ingrid Brunner
Ken Swofford as Paul Church
Julius Harris as George Rigney
Chuck McCann as Buddy Marino
Michael Lerner as Phillip Conover
Bruce Boxleitner as Richie Danko

Reception
Synopsis from Modcinema:A Cry for Help (working title: End of the Line) stars Robert Culp as an acerbic, Don Imus-like radio talk show host. When one of his callers, an anxious young woman, threatens to kill herself, Culp laughs it off. Later, however, he realizes that the girl wasn't kidding, and mounts a frantic effort-with the help of his loyal audience-to locate the would-be suicide. Richard Levinson and William Link's script stretches the tension level to the snapping point, and you'll love every minute of it.

References

External links

1975 television films
1975 films
1975 drama films
Films about radio people
ABC Movie of the Week
Films directed by Daryl Duke
American drama television films
1970s American films